Karl Koller (December 3, 1857 – March 21, 1944) was an Austrian ophthalmologist who began his medical career as a surgeon at the Vienna General Hospital and a colleague of Sigmund Freud.

Koller introduced cocaine as a local anaesthetic for eye surgery. Prior to this discovery, he had tested solutions such as chloral hydrate and morphine as anaesthetics in the eyes of laboratory animals without success. Freud was fully aware of the pain-killing properties of cocaine, but Koller recognized its tissue-numbing capabilities, and in 1884 demonstrated its potential as a local anaesthetic to the medical community. Koller's findings were a medical breakthrough. Prior to his discovery, performing eye surgery was difficult because the involuntary reflex motions of the eye to respond to the slightest stimuli. Later, cocaine was also used as a local anaesthetic in other medical fields such as dentistry. In the 20th century, other agents such as lidocaine have replaced cocaine as a local anaesthetic.

In 1888, Karl Koller moved to the United States and practiced ophthalmology in New York. He received many distinctions in his career, including being honored by the American Ophthalmological Society as the first recipient of the "Lucien Howe Medal" in 1922. This award is given to physicians in recognition of outstanding achievements in ophthalmology. In 1930 he was also honored by the Medical Association of Vienna.

One of Koller's patients was a blind ten-year-old boy named Chauncey D. Leake. Leake recovered his sight and, as an adult, discovered the anaesthetic divinyl ether.

Koller was reputedly nicknamed "Coca Koller" for his association with the drug and although he was implored to recognise his status as a public figure due to his discovery of local anaesthesia, he did not engage in autobiography.

See also 
 Gustav Gärtner

References

External links 
 Koller and Cocaine
 Was Dr. Carl Koller driven from Vienna in 1885?

1857 births
1944 deaths
Austrian Jews
Jewish scientists
Austrian ophthalmologists
American ophthalmologists
People from Sušice